The Schwarzmönch (German for "black monk") (2,649 m) is a mountain of the Bernese Alps, overlooking Lauterbrunnen in the Bernese Oberland. It forms a huge buttress on the north-west side of the Jungfrau, to which it is connected by the ridge named Ufem Schwarzen Grat.

East the summit is located the Silberhorn Hut.

References

External links

 Schwarzmönch on Hikr

Mountains of the Alps
Mountains of Switzerland
Mountains of the canton of Bern
Two-thousanders of Switzerland